This is a list of islands of the United States, as ordered by area.  It includes most islands with an area greater than 20 square miles (approximately 52 km2). Mainland areas cut by man-made canals are not considered islands.

Islands over

Islands  

See also 

 List of islands by area
 List of islands of the United States

References 

Area
United States